The 15th FINA World Junior Synchronised Swimming Championships was held from 9 to 13 July 2022 at the Palace of Water Sports in Kazan, Russia. It was the last edition of the championships to use synchronized swimming in the name of the event before the change of the name of the sport to artistic swimming in 2017.

Results

 Individual was a reserve competitor.

Medal table

References

External links
 Results

FINA World Junior Synchronised Swimming Championships
2016 in synchronized swimming
Synchronised swimming in Russia
July 2016 sports events in Russia
International aquatics competitions hosted by Russia
Sport in Kazan
21st century in Kazan